Charles Hayfron-Benjamin was a Ghanaian Supreme Court Judge. 
Hayfron-Benjamin had his secondary education at the Adisadel College at Cape Coast in the Central Region of Ghana. He went on to study law. He was in private legal practice in Ghana prior to being appointed a Supreme Court Judge by Jerry Rawlings, President of Ghana in 1993. He retired in 1999 but continued to work with the Continuing Legal Education programme of the Ghana judiciary until 2002. He died in 2007, aged 78 years following an illness.

See also
List of judges of the Supreme Court of Ghana
Supreme Court of Ghana
Judiciary of Ghana

References

2007 deaths
Justices of the Supreme Court of Ghana
20th-century judges
Alumni of Adisadel College
1929 births